Alliağa is a village in Tarsus  district of Mersin Province, Turkey. At    it is situated in Çukurova (Cilicia of the antiquity) plains to the east of Karabucak Forest. The population of Aliaga  is 708  as of 2011.

References

Villages in Tarsus District